"Strange & Beautiful (I'll Put A Spell On You)" is a song by English singer-songwriter and musician Aqualung, released in 2002. The song was used as background music for the Volkswagen Beetle advert in the UK in mid-2002. According to the sleeve notes of the album, the song, along with all the other songs were recorded entirely in Matt Hales' hallway.

Charts

Personnel
 Matt Hales - vocals, piano, production
 Anthony Phillips - bass
 Marius de Vries - production, additional keyboards, programming

References

2002 songs
Aqualung (musician) songs
Songs written by Aqualung (musician)
Trip hop songs
Song recordings produced by Marius de Vries
B-Unique Records singles